ContentBox Modular CMS is an open-source content management system for CFML, created by Ortus Solutions, Corp. ContentBox has been designed as a modular HMVC software based on Hibernate ORM and the ColdBox Platform.

ContentBox Modular CMS is dual-licensed as  Apache v2 or a commercial license.

Features
 Modular architecture.
 Content store modeled after the Java Content Repository (JCR)
 Hibernate ORM object oriented model.
 Multiple caching layers.
 Permission based security system.
 Login tracker with auto-banning capabilities.
 WYSIWYG page editing.
 Customisable templates and layouts.
 Programmable API for creating Modules
 Built-in user tracking & email marketing.
 Multi-language i18n support.
 Audit trails, versioning and rollback.
 Content scheduling and workflows.
 Buil-in URL firewall

Compatibility
ContentBox Modular CMS is a CFML-powered web application, and runs on any modern CFML engine, including Adobe ColdFusion 9 and above, Lucee 4.5 and above, Railo 2 and above.

ContentBox Modular CMS is also delivered as a WAR file on any standard Java servlet container, such as Apache Tomcat.

Hosting 
 Viviotech 
 Hostek

External links
Official site
Documentation Book
GitHub code repository
Google Group

References

CFML programming language
Content management systems